Abyssocottus is a genus of ray-finned fishes belonging to the family Cottidae, the typical sculpins. These sculpins are endemic to Lake Baikal in Russia.

Taxonomy
Abyssocottus was first proposed as a genus by the Russian ichthyologist Lev Berg with Abyssocottus korotneffi designated as its type species. The 5th edition of Fishes of the World classified this genus within the subfamily Abyssocottinae. However, other authorities have used phylogenetic studies which have found that Baikal sculpins that were classified in the subfamilies Comephorinae and Abyssocottinae by Fishes of the World radiated from an ancestor which was likely to be within the genus Cottus and that the classification  of the Baikal sculpins in a different taxon from Cottus was paraphyletic.

Species
There are currently three recognized species in this genus:
 Abyssocottus elochini Taliev, 1955
 Abyssocottus gibbosus L. S. Berg, 1906
 Abyssocottus korotneffi L. S. Berg, 1906

References

 
Scorpaeniformes genera
Fish of Lake Baikal
Taxa named by Lev Berg
Fauna of Lake Baikal